Theresa Meeker Pickett is an American written, web, and video content creator.

Written and Web Content Creation 
With a focus on storytelling, Theresa produces written and web content, including long-form and short-form writing.

Her website, Enjoying Family Life, features interviews with creative minds and celebrities, including Jeff Kinney. In her previous blog Theresa's Reviews, she covered the 2017 USA premiere of Disney Pixar's Coco and Olaf's Frozen Adventure from the red carpet in Hollywood. She interviewed Lee Unkrich, Adrian Molina, Anthony Gonzalez, Gael García Bernal, Benjamin Bratt, Alanna Ubach, and Edward James Olmos. Fox 45 Baltimore invited her on the morning news on several occasions as a lifestyle expert, and Febreze selected her as a brand ambassador representing their line of products.

She is the author of Colette Goes to Hollywood, a children's story. She also published My Doll Journal and Filmmaking Notebook.

She says, 

For over 10 years, she has written for web and print outlets, including Huffington Post and StudentFilmmakers Magazine.

Video Content Creation 
Theresa uses the latest trends, creativity, and a personal touch to create social media video content that has gone viral. While prioritizing thoughtful brand messaging, she has shown flexibility in her role while working on the production of movies, commercials, and television shows, earning credits that include casting director, producer, actress, and publicist.

She owns Pickett Films, a production company for children's films, with her husband and two children. Her daughter Georgiana is the recipient of the Jane Goodall Institute's Roots & Shoots grant to make possible the Maryland Children's Environmental Film Festival, which will feature movies made by children for children, to inspire awareness of environmental issues. Theresa will serve as the adult organizer of the film festival.

As a filmmaking coach, she taught hundreds of children to make their own movies with a focus on scriptwriting and a red carpet-premiere celebration.

She coached her daughters in making the short movie 'The Purpose of Pandemic Gardening,' which won the Flora and Fauna award in the Discovery Film Festival 2022, and it premiered in Philadelphia at the Wagner Free Institute of Science. It was selected in the Ocean City Film Festival 2023, Nature without Borders International Film Festival 2023, and Docs without Borders Film Festival 2023.

She coached her daughter Samantha in writing, directing, and producing 'A Halloween Sleepover,' a stop motion animation movie, which won the Young Filmmaker award in the Holidays 365 International Film Festival. It was selected by Ponza Film Awards Italy, North Beach American Film Festival, Kids First! Film Festival, DDTV Festival, and The Girl Improved Film & Television Festival. It received an honorable mention in the Fear Faire Film Festival.

Samantha also wrote, directed, and produced 'The Power of Play,' which won the Mountain Lion Award in the Golden Lion Film Festival. It was an official selection and winner of a People's Choice award in the Ocean City Film Festival. It was an official selection of the Chesapeake Film Festival, North Beach American Film Festival, DDTV Festival, and the SE Pennsylvania Teen Filmmakers Showcase. 'The Power of Play' stars the family dog, a Yorkshire Terrier named Coco.

Together with her daughter Georgiana, Theresa made 'Twisted in Time,' a mixed media short film that was a selection in the North Beach American Film Festival, Green Screen Film Festival, DDTV Festival, and The Girl Improved Film & Television Festival. Georgiana also wrote a song 'Look into Your Heart,' that won in the state-wide Reflections Arts Competition for Outstanding Interpretation in Musical Composition.

Theresa was the associate producer of avant-garde short film Look, which won awards in the Accolade Competition, Best Shorts Competition, California Film Awards, Honolulu Film Awards and two awards in the Los Angeles Movie Awards. Look received a 4-star review from Film Threat.

References

External links
 

Vanderbilt University alumni
1986 births
American film actresses
Flagler College alumni
American television actresses
People from Nashville, Tennessee
Living people
21st-century American actresses
American women film producers
Writers from Maryland